Mohamed Mimoune (born 21 September 1987) is a French professional boxer who held the IBO super-lightweight title in 2018. At regional level, he held the European and European Union welterweight titles between 2016 and 2017.

Professional career
On 11 April 2015, Mimoune faced undefeated Spanish boxer "Ferino V" Ceferino Rodríguez in Benidorm, Spain. Mimoune won the eight-round bout by unanimous decision.

On 16 January 2016, Mimoune defeated Kamal Mohamed to win the France welterweight title in Toulouse. He won the bout by unanimous decision, avenging a prior loss to Kamal when the two fought in 2013 in Clermont-Ferrand.

On 10 March, the EBU ordered Mimoune and Spanish boxer Kerman Lejarraga the opportunity to face off for its European Union welterweight title vacated by Paulie Malignaggi. Mimoune defeated Nabil Krissi by technical knockout in the fourth round to claim the EU title.

On 17 December 2016, Mimoune defeated Damien Martin by unanimous decision to retain the European Union title in Noisy-le-Grand.

On 31 March 2017, Mimoune defeated Jussi Koivula by unanimous decision to retain the European Union title.

On 7 October, Mimoune defeated British welterweight Sam Eggington to win the European championship in Manchester, England. He dominated the bout but won by split decision.

On 20 January 2018, Mimoune faced undefeated Argentine boxer Emiliano Dominguez Rodriguez for the vacant IBO world title last held by Julius Indongo. He defeated Rodriquez by unanimous decision to win the IBO light-welterweight title in Paris, France.

On 20 October, Mimoune defeated Franck Petitjean by unanimous decision to retain his IBO light-welterweight title in Dakar, Senegal.

Personal life
Mimoune began boxing when he was nine years old. He also played football as a child. He began training at the Boxing Toulouse Bagatelle at the age of 12.

Professional boxing record

References

External links
 
 
 

1987 births
Living people
French male boxers
Sportspeople from Toulouse
Light-welterweight boxers
Welterweight boxers
European Boxing Union champions
International Boxing Organization champions